Richard Lawrence Buchanan Jr. (born May 8, 1969) is a former American professional football player who was a wide receiver in the National Football League (NFL) and the World League of American Football (WLAF). He played for the Los Angeles Rams of the NFL, and the Frankfurt Galaxy of the WLAF. Buchanan played collegiately at Northwestern University.

References

1969 births
Living people
American football wide receivers
Miami Dolphins players
Frankfurt Galaxy players
Los Angeles Rams players
Northwestern Wildcats football players
Players of American football from Chicago